In mathematics, a singularity is a point at which a given mathematical object is not defined, or a point where the mathematical object ceases to be well-behaved in some particular way, such as by lacking differentiability or analyticity.

For example, the function

For singularities in algebraic geometry, see singular point of an algebraic variety. For singularities in differential geometry, see singularity theory.

Real analysis
In real analysis, singularities are either discontinuities, or discontinuities of the derivative (sometimes also discontinuities of higher order derivatives). There are four kinds of discontinuities: type I, which has two subtypes, and type II, which can also be divided into two subtypes (though usually is not).

To describe the way these two types of limits are being used, suppose that  is a function of a real argument , and for any value of its argument, say , then the left-handed limit, and the right-handed limit, are defined by:

The value  is the value that the function  tends towards as the value  approaches  from below, and the value  is the value that the function  tends towards as the value  approaches  from above, regardless of the actual value the function has at the point where  .

There are some functions for which these limits do not exist at all. For example, the function

does not tend towards anything as  approaches . The limits in this case are not infinite, but rather undefined: there is no value that  settles in on. Borrowing from complex analysis, this is sometimes called an essential singularity.

The possible cases at a given value  for the argument are as follows.
All the values must be finite.
 A type I discontinuity occurs when both  and  exist and are finite, but at least one of the following three conditions also applies:
 ;
  has a defined value, which, however, does not match the value of the two limits.

Type I discontinuities can be further distinguished as being one of the following subtypes:
 A jump discontinuity occurs when , regardless of whether  is defined, and regardless of its value if it is defined.
 A removable discontinuity occurs when , also regardless of whether  is defined, and regardless of its value if it is defined (but which does not match that of the two limits).
 A type II discontinuity occurs when either  or  does not exist (possibly both). This has two subtypes, which are usually not considered separately:
 An infinite discontinuity is the special case when either the left hand or right hand limit does not exist, specifically because it is infinite, and the other limit is either also infinite, or is some well defined finite number. In other words, the function has an infinite discontinuity when its graph has a vertical asymptote.
 An essential singularity is a term borrowed from complex analysis (see below). This is the case when either one or the other limits  or  does not exist, but not because it is an infinite discontinuity. Essential singularities approach no limit, not even if valid answers are extended to include .

In real analysis, a singularity or discontinuity is a property of a function alone. Any singularities that may exist in the derivative of a function are considered as belonging to the derivative, not to the original function.

Coordinate singularities

A coordinate singularity occurs when an apparent singularity or discontinuity occurs in one coordinate frame, which can be removed by choosing a different frame. An example of this is the apparent singularity at the 90 degree latitude in spherical coordinates. An object moving due north (for example, along the line 0 degrees longitude) on the surface of a sphere will suddenly experience an instantaneous change in longitude at the pole (in the case of the example, jumping from longitude 0 to longitude 180 degrees).  This discontinuity, however, is only apparent; it is an artifact of the coordinate system chosen, which is singular at the poles.  A different coordinate system would eliminate the apparent discontinuity (e.g., by replacing the latitude/longitude representation with an -vector representation).

Complex analysis
In complex analysis, there are several classes of singularities. These include the isolated singularities, the nonisolated singularities and the branch points.

Isolated singularities
Suppose that  is a function that is complex differentiable in the complement of a point  in an open subset  of the complex numbers  Then:
The function  is a continuous replacement for the function .
The least such number  is called the order of the pole. The derivative at a non-essential singularity itself has a non-essential singularity, with  increased by 1 (except if  is 0 so that the singularity is removable).
 The point  is an essential singularity of  if it is neither a removable singularity nor a pole. The point  is an essential singularity if and only if the Laurent series has infinitely many powers of negative degree.

Nonisolated singularities
Other than isolated singularities, complex functions of one variable may exhibit other singular behaviour. These are termed nonisolated singularities, of which there are two types:

 Cluster points: limit points of isolated singularities. If they are all poles, despite admitting Laurent series expansions on each of them, then no such expansion is possible at its limit.
 Natural boundaries: any non-isolated set (e.g. a curve) on which functions cannot be analytically continued around (or outside them if they are closed curves in the Riemann sphere).

Branch points
The cut is a line or curve excluded from the domain to introduce a technical separation between discontinuous values of the function. When the cut is genuinely required, the function will have distinctly different values on each side of the branch cut.

Finite-time singularity

A finite-time singularity occurs when one input variable is time, and an output variable increases towards infinity at a finite time. These are important in kinematics and Partial Differential Equations – infinites do not occur physically, but the behavior near the singularity is often of interest. Mathematically, the simplest finite-time singularities are power laws for various exponents of the form  of which the simplest is hyperbolic growth, where the exponent is (negative) 1:  More precisely, in order to get a singularity at positive time as time advances (so the output grows to infinity), one instead uses  (using t for time, reversing direction to  so that time increases to infinity, and shifting the singularity forward from 0 to a fixed time ).

An example would be the bouncing motion of an inelastic ball on a plane. If idealized motion is considered, in which the same fraction of kinetic energy is lost on each bounce, the frequency of bounces becomes infinite, as the ball comes to rest in a finite time. Other examples of finite-time singularities include the various forms of the Painlevé paradox (for example, the tendency of a chalk to skip when dragged across a blackboard), and how the precession rate of a coin spun on a flat surface accelerates towards infinite—before abruptly stopping (as studied using the Euler's Disk toy).

Hypothetical examples include Heinz von Foerster's facetious "Doomsday's equation" (simplistic models yield infinite human population in finite time).

Algebraic geometry and commutative algebra
In algebraic geometry, a singularity of an algebraic variety is a point of the variety where the tangent space may not be regularly defined. The simplest example of singularities are curves that cross themselves. But there are other types of singularities, like cusps. For example, the equation  defines a curve that has a cusp at the origin . One could define the -axis as a tangent at this point, but this definition can not be the same as the definition at other points. In fact, in this case, the -axis is a "double tangent."

For affine and projective varieties, the singularities are the points where the Jacobian matrix has a rank which is lower than at other points of the variety.

An equivalent definition in terms of commutative algebra may be given, which extends to abstract varieties and schemes: A point is singular if the local ring at this point is not a regular local ring.

See also
Catastrophe theory
Defined and undefined
Degeneracy (mathematics) 
Division by zero
Hyperbolic growth
Pathological (mathematics)
Singular solution
Removable singularity

References

Mathematical analysis